World Islamic Mission (WIM) is an international Muslim organisation of Sufi-inspired Barelvi Sunni Muslims. It was  established in the United Kingdom and inaugurated by Shah Ahmad Noorani Siddiqi, Pir Syed Ma'roof Hussain Shah Arif Qadri Naushahi and  Arshadul Qaudri in Mecca in 1972. The World Islamic Mission has grown to serve Muslims across Europe, the United States of America, North America, Africa, and Asia. The headquarters of World Islamic Mission is in Manchester, UK.

Mission
Its aim is to spread the true teachings of Islam in the light of Hadiths and Sunnah of Prophet Muhammad. In this regard it is active in at least 24 countries around the world. It aims to promote Islamic knowledge, enhance social development, spread the message of Islam, and inculcate sincere love and respect for Prophet Muhammad.

Leaders
The movement is led by Qamaruzzaman Azmi, a Sunni Muslim scholar who was named in 2011 by Georgetown University as one of the "500 Most Influential Muslims in the World".

Shahid Raza OBE, an Islamic scholar is another leader of the Mission. He was born on 13 December 1950 in Fatahpur, India. At the invitation of the management council of Islamic Centre Leicester, he arrived in the UK in February 1978 and joined the centre to serve as its Head Imam. He moved in 1984 to London. He is also Executive Secretary and Registrar of The Muslim Law (Shariah) Council UK.

References

 
1972 establishments in the United Kingdom
Islamic organisations based in the United Kingdom
Organisations based in Manchester
Islamic organizations established in 1972
Sunni organizations
Barelvi organizations